Scheemda is a village with a population of 2,445 in the municipality of Oldambt in the province of Groningen in the Netherlands. Scheemda was a separate municipality until 2010, when it merged with Reiderland and Winschoten to form the municipality of Oldambt.

History 
Until 2010, Scheemda was a separate municipality with the population centers Heiligerlee, Midwolda, Nieuw-Scheemda, Nieuwolda, Oostwold, Scheemda, 't Waar and Westerlee. On 1 January 2010, the municipality merged into Oldambt.

Transportation 
The Scheemda railway station was opened in 1868 and has train services to Zuidbroek and Groningen in the west, and Winschoten, Bad Nieuweschans, and Leer (Germany) in the east.

Notable people  
 Pieter Smit (1963–2018), mayor of Oldambt (2010–2018), lived and died here

Gallery

References

External links 
 

Municipalities of the Netherlands disestablished in 2010
Former municipalities of Groningen (province)
Populated places in Groningen (province)
Oldambt (municipality)